Oh Hye-soo (born May 30, 1995) is a South Korean actress. Her notable role was school bullying victim Min Eun-ji from All of Us Are Dead (2022).

Personal life and career
Oh Hye-soo was a student of Korea National University of Arts and she majored in theater. She was also a promising savate boxing athele in Gyeonggi Province during her younger years.

Oh made her acting debut in the 2017 web-drama Seventeen, and later earned roles in web series Flower-like Ending in 2018 and in 2019 Cat Bartender and The Story of Yohan Kim. 

Oh gained attention for her portrayal of school bullying victim Min Eun-ji from All of Us Are Dead in 2022. She made her cameo appearance in Extraordinary Attorney Woo as Shin Hye-young, an intellectually disabled rape victim.

Filmography

Television series

References

External links 
 
 

1995 births
Living people
21st-century South Korean actresses